Kaloplocamus maculatus is a species of sea slug, a nudibranch, a shell-less marine gastropod mollusk in the family Polyceridae.

Distribution 
This species was described from Chile as Euplocamus maculatus. Recent finds of larger animals from this area suggest that it may actually be a Plocamopherus species, but the name Plocamopherus maculatus is occupied by another species.

References

External links 
 SeaSlug Forum info

Polyceridae
Gastropods described in 1898
Endemic fauna of Chile